Nancy Lou Saunders (June 29, 1925 – June 13, 2020) was an American actress of film, television and the stage.

Career 
Saunders appeared in over 20 films between 1946 and 1957. She was discovered when a talent scout was looking for attractive actresses who could ride a horse.

Saunders was a contract actress first with RKO Pictures and later with Columbia Pictures.

To modern viewers, Saunders is known for her roles in several Three Stooges films from the Shemp Howard era, specifically I'm a Monkey's Uncle (and its remake Stone Age Romeos) and as Lady Godiva in The Ghost Talks.

Saunders entered the "Queen" competition at the 1972 All American Quarter Horse Congress.

Personal life
Saunders was born in Hollywood, Los Angeles in June 1925. In December 1946, Saunders married used-car dealer Ray Russell Davioni in Las Vegas. The marriage was annulled in August 1947.

She died from leukemia in Mission Viejo, California in June 2020 at the age of 94.

Selected filmography

 The Bamboo Blonde (1946) as glamour girl
 Lady Luck (1946) as manicurist
 The Secret of the Whistler (1946) as girl
 Slappily Married (1946) as bellhop
 Criminal Court (1946) as secretary
 The Locket (1946) as Miss Wyatt - Blair's secretary
 South of the Chisholm Trail (1946) as Nora Grant
 The Thirteenth Hour (1947) as Donna
 West of Dodge City (1947) as Anne Avery
 A Likely Story (1947) as blonde on train
 Law of the Canyon (1947) as Mary Coleman
 The Millerson Case (1947) as Belle Englehart
 Prairie Raiders (1947) as Ann Bradford
 The Woman on the Beach (1947) as girl at party
 Brideless Groom (1947) as former girlfriend
 When a Girl's Beautiful (1947) as Sue Dennis, model
 Her Husband's Affairs (1947) as nurse
 The Lone Wolf in London (1947) as Ann Klemscott
 It Had to Be You (1947) as Nancy, the model
 Six-Gun Law (1948) as June Wallace
 Mrs. O'Malley and Mr. Malone (1950) as Joanie

References

External links

 Nancy Saunders at the American Film Institute
Nancy Saunders interview at Western Clippings

1925 births
2020 deaths
20th-century American actresses
Actresses from Los Angeles
American film actresses
Western (genre) film actresses
21st-century American women